Frédéric Michel (born 4 October 1914, date of death unknown) is a Swiss former sports shooter. He competed in the 50 metre pistol event at the 1960 Summer Olympics.

References

External links
 

1914 births
Year of death missing
Swiss male sport shooters
Olympic shooters of Switzerland
Shooters at the 1960 Summer Olympics
People from Duino
Sportspeople from Friuli-Venezia Giulia